Doru is a genus of earwigs in the family Forficulidae.

Species
These 16 species belong to the genus Doru:

 Doru aculeatum (Scudder, 1876) i c g b (spine-tailed earwig)
 Doru albipes (Fabricius, 1787) c g
 Doru beybienkoi Steinmann, 1979 c g
 Doru cincinnatoi Machado, 1967 c g
 Doru davisi Rehn and Hebard, 1914 i c g
 Doru dohrni Steinmann, 1979 c g
 Doru gracilis (Burmeister, 1838) c g
 Doru leucopteryx Burr, 1912 c g
 Doru lineare (Eschscholtz, 1822) i c g
 Doru luteipes (Scudder, 1876) c g
 Doru platensis Borelli, 1912 c g
 Doru robustum Brindle, 1971 c g
 Doru spiculiferum (Kirby, WF, 1891) c g
 Doru taeniatum (Dohrn, 1862) i c g b (lined earwig)
 Doru turbator Steinmann, 1979 c g
 Doru unicolor Brindle, 1971 c g

Data sources: i = ITIS, c = Catalogue of Life, g = GBIF, b = Bugguide.net

References

Forficulidae
Dermaptera genera